An EMD GP20 is a 4-axle diesel-electric locomotive built by General Motors' Electro-Motive Division between November 1959 and April 1962. Power was provided by an EMD 567D2 16-cylinder turbocharged engine which generated . EMD was initially hesitant to turbocharge their 567-series diesel engine, but was spurred on to do so following successful tests made by Union Pacific in the form of UP's experimental Omaha GP20 units. 260 examples of EMD's production locomotive model (with the EMD turbocharger) were built for American railroads.

The GP20 was the second EMD production locomotive to be built with an EMD turbocharged diesel engine, sixteen months after the six-axle (C-C) model SD24. Nevertheless, the turbocharged GP20 provided full rated power at all altitudes, which the Roots-blown GP18 could not provide.

EMD-type Turbo-Compressor (Turbocharger) 

The turbocharger was the then-new EMD mechanically assisted turbo-compressor. During engine startup, and at lower power levels, during which there is not sufficient exhaust heat energy to drive the turbine fast enough for the compressor to supply the air necessary for combustion, the engine drives the compressor through a gear train and a freewheel. At higher power levels, the freewheel is disengaged, and the turbo-compressor operates as a true turbocharger. It is possible for the turbo-compressor to revert to compressor mode momentarily during commands for large increases in engine power. Turbocharging provides higher horsepower and good running characteristics at all altitudes. Turbocharging also improves fuel consumption and reduces emissions.

Previous Union Pacific experiments with turbocharging had utilized multiple Elliot or Garrett AiResearch turbochargers feeding the usual pair of Roots blowers. EMD's mechanically assisted turbocharger eliminated the need for the pair of Roots blowers and also integrated the turbocharging function from two (Elliot) or four (AiResearch) smaller add-on turbochargers into one much larger, turbo-compressor (turbocharger) with intercooling.

The introduction of the EMD-type turbocharger was successful and all subsequent GP series were offered with this turbocharger, although not all models within a series were offered with turbocharging (e.g., the 38 models were Roots-blown).

Original buyers

Preservation 

Western Pacific 2001, the very first GP20 built, is preserved at Western Pacific Railroad Museum at Portola, CA.
KLIX 2003, originally Cotton Belt 815, is being stored at the Arkansas Railroad Museum in Pine Bluff, AR.
Midland Railway 4079, originally Southern Pacific 7229, is on The Midland Railway in Baldwin City, Kansas.

References 

 
 
 
 http://www.trainweb.org/jaydeet/gp20.htm Robert Sarberenyi roster with phase information and fuel tank size

External links

 photos of EMD GP20s rrpicturearchives.net

GP20
B-B locomotives
Diesel-electric locomotives of the United States
Railway locomotives introduced in 1959
Freight locomotives
Standard gauge locomotives of the United States